Kath Malmberg is an American former competitive figure skater. She is the 1973 Nebelhorn Trophy champion, the 1974 Prague Skate champion, the 1975 Skate Canada International silver medalist, and a two-time (1974-1975) U.S. national bronze medalist.

Malmberg married American figure skater Gordon McKellen in 1977 and gave birth to their two children in the 1980s.

Results

References

 skatabase

American female single skaters
Living people
Year of birth missing (living people)
21st-century American women